Events during the year 1952 in Northern Ireland.

Incumbents
 Governor - 	Earl Granville (until 1 December), The Lord Wakehurst (from 1 December)  
 Prime Minister - Basil Brooke

Events
 August - Official opening of Binnian Tunnel, feeding water to the Silent Valley Reservoir under the Mourne Mountains.
 12 November – Murder of Patricia Curran, 19-year-old daughter of Sir Lancelot Curran. Iain Hay Gordon was found guilty of her murder, but the sentence was overturned in 2000.

Arts and literature
 Daniel O'Neill paints Birth.

Sport

Football
Irish League
Winners: Glenavon

Irish Cup
Winners: Ards 1 - 0 Glentoran

Births
8 January – Alex Maskey, first Sinn Féin Lord Mayor of Belfast, Councillor and MLA.
18 January – Derek Spence, footballer.
25 February – Joey Dunlop, motorcycle racer (died 2000).
1 March – Martin O'Neill, international footballer and football manager.
2 March – Lenny Murphy, loyalist paramilitary and leader of the Shankill Butchers (died 1982).
4 April – Gary Moore, guitarist.
7 June – Liam Neeson, actor.
25 June – Alan Green, sports broadcaster.
17 October – Graham Forsythe, artist.
20 December – Terry George, screenwriter and director.

Full date unknown
Gerald Dawe, writer and poet.

John Linehan, comedian (May McFettridge).
Tommy McKearney, former hunger striker and member of the Provisional Irish Republican Army, now a journalist.
William Peskett, poet.

Deaths
Louisa Watson Peat, writer and lecturer (born 1883)

See also
1952 in Scotland
1952 in Wales

References